Frans Herman Hanhisalo (11 May 1893, in Lohtaja – 30 May 1935) was a Finnish farmer, temperance movement activist and politician. He was a member of the Parliament of Finland from 1919 to 1921, representing the Agrarian League.

References

1893 births
1935 deaths
People from Kokkola
People from Vaasa Province (Grand Duchy of Finland)
Centre Party (Finland) politicians
Members of the Parliament of Finland (1919–22)
Finnish farmers
Finnish temperance activists